Paraulacizes is a genus of sharpshooters in the family Cicadellidae. There are about 11 described species in Paraulacizes.

Species
 Paraulacizes aurantiaca (Signoret, 1855) c
 Paraulacizes confusa (Signoret, 1855) c g
 Paraulacizes figurata (Fowler, 1898) c g
 Paraulacizes irrorata (Fabricius, 1794) c g b (speckled sharpshooter)
 Paraulacizes lugubris (Fowler, 1898) c g
 Paraulacizes mutans (Signoret, 1855) c g
 Paraulacizes panamensis (Fowler, 1899) c g
 Paraulacizes piperata (Fowler, 1898) c g
 Paraulacizes pollinosa (Fowler, 1899) c g
 Paraulacizes sparsa (Fowler, 1899) c g b
 Paraulacizes thunbergii (Stal, 1864) c g
Data sources: i = ITIS, c = Catalogue of Life, g = GBIF, b = Bugguide.net

References

Further reading

External links

 

Cicadellidae genera
Proconiini